Divya Venkatasubramaniam, better known by her stage name Kaniha or Kanika, is an Indian actress who predominantly works in Malayalam cinema along with a few Tamil, Telugu and Kannada movies. Kaniha made her debut in the 2002 Tamil film Five Star.

Early life
Kaniha is Tamilian by birth,She won the Tamil Nadu State Award for Educational Excellence in 1999. Having improved her singing talent since childhood by participating in pop music and light music shows, Divya was interested in the performing arts. While she was still studying, she gave stage performances as a pop singer from time to time. When she was scheduled to perform at the Miss Chennai beauty pageant in 2001, she was selected to participate in the pageant after a model had backed out at the last minute. Despite lack of experience, she emerged victorious at that contest, which later paved way for a film career.

Career

Susi Ganesan spotted Kaniha on a magazine cover page and insisted on her performing the lead female role in his second feature film. Divya eventually entered the Film industry, accepting the offer, while her name was changed to Kaniha. Her debut film was the Mani Ratnam-produced Five Star (2002) with Prasanna, who made his acting debut as well, in which Kaniha portrayed a traditional village girl. She completed the entire film during her summer holidays, since she was a student.

Kaniha turned down all projects that were subsequently offered to her, including films by S. Shankar and P. C. Sreeram, and went on to complete her graduation. Even before she finished her graduation, she completed her Telugu debut film Ottesi Cheputunna during her winter vacations, acting under another stage name Sravanthi. In regard to her performance, Idlebrain wrote: "Sravanthy looks homely in the film and suited the character. She performed well. She is good at dances as well".

After completing her studies, Kaniha decided to give herself a go at the Tinsel towns. She starred in the Kannada film Annavaru (2004), a remake of Mani Ratnam's Thalapathi (1991), stepping into Kannada filmdom, too. She followed the movie with a cameo role in Cheran's Autograph. Kaniha next appeared in a comedy oriented role in a commercial film by K. S. Ravikumar, Aethiree along with Madhavan, Sada, in which she portrayed a "naughty Brahmin girl". Sify labelled her performance in the film as "outstanding". She went on to play the female lead in Dancer opposite physically disabled Kutty, following which she returned to Telugu cinema, accepting to reprise her role in the Telugu remake of Autograph, Naa Autograph, playing the same role as in the original version. She proved to be an actress to reckon with in the Kannada film Sye, a remake of Tamil film Dhill. She finally ventured into Malayalam cinema as the heroine for the campus-based film  Ennitum.

Later in 2006, she appeared in her biggest project until then, Varalaru, directed again by K. S. Ravikumar, in which she shared screen space with Ajith Kumar and Asin. She won plaudits for her role as a mentally disordered girl. After a two-years gap, her most recent Kannada film Rajakumari opposite Ravichandran got released, in which she again got to play the female lead role.

After her marriage, when she was supposed to bid adieu to the film industry, Kaniha returned to Malayalam cinema in 2009, with the films Bhagyadevatha, directed by veteran Sathyan Anthikkad and starring Jayaram and Narain as well, and Pazhassi Raja, directed by reputed director Hariharan and starring Mammootty, Sarath Kumar and Padmapriya among others. While the former one, in which she played the role of a homely Christian girl, was highly successful at the box office, the latter one, a biographical historical film, in which she played the role of a queen opposite Mammootty. Her performance in Bhagyadevatha led to her winning several awards. Her rising adulation in the Malayalam industry saw her eventually sign laudable roles in the films My Big Father and Christian Brothers before she took a maternity break.

Other work
Besides acting, Kaniha has ventured into other fields, working as a dubbing artiste, playback singer and TV host, proving to be a versatile and talented person.

Television
At the prime of her career, Kaniha moved to "small screen", hosting a couple of TV shows, which she believed were a "refreshing change from movies". She had first hosted the second season of the popular comedy show Kalakka Povathu Yaaru on STAR Vijay in 2006, following which she had hosted the popular family based game show Mega Thanga Vettai, the annual Chutti Vikatan Children's Quiz Show both on Sun TV. Besides, she also played a lead role in the television serial Thiruvilayadal on Sun TV. She has judged popular reality shows like Sundari Neeyum Sundaran Njaanum, Star Singer both on Asianet. In 2015 she judged Uggram Ujjwalam a Malayalam reality show on Mazhavil Manorama.She judges Grand Magical Circus on Amrita TV.

Dubbing and singing career
Kaniha has ventured into playback singing and dubbing as well. Having a vast experience and being a professional singer before turning actress, Kaniha got the offer to sing the theme song of her debut film Five Star. She then became a dubbing artiste, dubbing for actresses Genelia D'Souza in Sachein, Sadha in Anniyan and Shriya Saran in Sivaji: The Boss.

Advertisements
Kaniha has also featured in print and TV ads of some reputed corporates. Some of them are listed below.

 The Chennai Silks
 Kalyan Sarees and Jewellers
 Rathna Thanga Maligai
 Tata Gold Plus
 SPP Silks, Erode
 Aachi Masala
 Seemas Silks
ICL Fincorp
Mahalakshmi Silks
 N Style

Personal life
Kaniha married Shyam Radhakrishnan, brother of Jayashree on 15 June 2008 who works as a US-based software engineer. They have a son Sai Rishi born in November 2010. Initially she had decided to leave the film industry, finishing her career as an actress, and to settle down in the US, stating that she, however, would complete her hitherto signed films. In January 2009 then, Kaniha, unexpectedly, announced her comeback with the Sathyan Anthikkad-directed Malayalam film Bhagyadevatha.

Filmography

As actress

As dubbing artiste

As playback singer

Television
Shows

Serials

See also
 List of BITS Pilani alumni

References

External links 
 
 Kanika's profile at Nilacharal
 Interview to rediff.com in May 2007
 Flixster Profile

Living people
Indian film actresses
Tamil actresses
Actresses in Malayalam cinema
Actresses in Tamil cinema
Actresses in Telugu cinema
Actresses in Kannada cinema
Birla Institute of Technology and Science, Pilani alumni
Tamil television actresses
21st-century Indian actresses
Tamil playback singers
Indian women playback singers
Singers from Tamil Nadu
Indian voice actresses
Women musicians from Tamil Nadu
21st-century Indian women singers
21st-century Indian singers
Year of birth missing (living people)